The Holy Cross Church is the name given to a religious building affiliated with the Catholic Church and is located in the city of Tampere, Finland. It offers religious services as the Mass in different languages (Finnish, Polish and English) in order to meet the different nationalities that make up the congregation.

The Catholic parish of Tampere was formally established on September 3, 1957. Masses were held for the first time in Hotel Tammer, later in Emmaus.

The congregation got its own church on November 22, 1969, being dedicated to the Holy Cross, and blessed with a parish hall, a presbytery, and other venues.

See also
Roman Catholicism in Finland
St. Henry's Cathedral

References

Buildings and structures in Tampere
Roman Catholic churches completed in 1957
Amuri, Tampere
20th-century Roman Catholic church buildings in Finland